New Hope Township is a non-functioning administrative division of Iredell County, North Carolina, United States. By the requirements of the North Carolina Constitution of 1868, the counties were divided into townships, which included New Hope township as one of sixteen townships in Iredell County.

Geography
New Hope township contains the town of Love Valley (population of 90 in 2010).

References

Townships in Iredell County, North Carolina
Townships in North Carolina
1868 establishments in North Carolina